Carla Hacken (born March 14, 1961) is an American film producer and former studio executive. She is best known for producing the critically acclaimed film Hell or High Water (2016), which earned her an Academy Award for Best Picture nomination alongside Julie Yorn. She is president and founder of her production company, Paper Pictures.

Awards and nominations 
 Nominated: Academy Award for Best Picture - Hell or High Water

References

External links
 

Living people
American film producers
1961 births